NAD or Nad may refer to:

Geography
 Nad, County Cork, a village in Ireland
 North American Datum, a series of geographic coordinate systems
 North Atlantic Drift, an Atlantic Ocean current
 Hobli, a subdivision of a taluka in southern India

Organizations
 National Academy of Design
 NAD Electronics, a Canadian audio equipment manufacturer (originally New Acoustic Dimension)
 National Advertising Division, the Council of Better Business Bureaus in the United States and Canada
 National Appeals Division, an agency within the United States Department of Agriculture
 National Association of the Deaf (disambiguation), one of several associations for deaf people
 Norwegian Association of the Disabled

Science, medicine and technology
 Na D, a spectroscopic line due to sodium
 Network Access Device, a device in mobile phones that finds the shortest route for a connection
 Nicotinamide adenine dinucleotide, a coenzyme and signaling molecule
 No acute distress, on physical exam
 Noradrenalin, a hormone and neurotransmitter
 Nucleolar-associating domains (NADs); regions of the chromosome that interact with the  nucleolus

Other uses
 Namibian dollar, the currency of Namibia
 Nađ, a Serbian-language surname
 Nad (surname) , an East Slavic-language transliteration of a Hungarian surname